Erwin Kuffer (born 16 September 1943) is a former Luxembourgish footballer who played as a defender.

Club career
Kuffer started his career at local team Red Boys Differdange and played in France for Lyon and in Belgium for Standard Liège.

International career
He made his debut for Luxembourg in 1965 and went on to earn over a dozen caps. Kuffer played in 8 FIFA World Cup qualification matches.

References

External links

1943 births
Living people
Association football defenders
Luxembourgian footballers
Luxembourgian expatriate footballers
FC Differdange 03 players
Olympique Lyonnais players
Standard Liège players
K. Waterschei S.V. Thor Genk players
R. Charleroi S.C. players
Ligue 1 players
Expatriate footballers in France
Expatriate footballers in Belgium
Luxembourg international footballers